The Doppa (Doppa) is a square or round skullcap originating in Central Asia, worn by Uzbeks, Uyghurs, Kazan Tatars and Tajiks. The doppa means "hat" in Uzbek, whereas in Uyghur it specifically refers to Doppa, not other types of hats. The hat is derived from the Khwarazmians, more pointed, ancestral cap, which can be seen in some of the portraits of Jalaleddin Mingburnu. Differences between Uzbek and Uyghur Doppas can be observed from their shape, method of making, and colour. Uyghur Doppas are round, whereas Uzbek doppas are square with pointy edges. Uyghur Doppas are relatively softer, while Uzbek doppas are slightly harder and set into shape with mold.

See also
Uyghur Doppa Day
 Tubeteika
 Chapan
 Caftan

Sources
 Aina J. Khan (2021): The New York Times "An Australian’s Search for Belonging Led to the Silk Road and a Famed Hat",

Caps